Beware the Gorilla is a 2019 Italian comedy film directed by Luca Miniero.

Plot
Lorenzo is a lawyer who decides to sue the zoo in his city, but after winning he has to take home a gorilla named Peppe. Lorenzo is divorcing, but uses his new awkward situation for saving his relationship with his children, the eldest son Ale and two twins named Rosa and Sara.

Cast

References

External links

Beware the Gorilla at Cineuropa

2019 films
Films directed by Luca Miniero
2010s Italian-language films
2019 comedy films
Italian comedy films
2010s Italian films
Warner Bros. films